Tomás de Figueroa y Caravaca  (1747 – 1811) was a Spanish soldier. He was active in the military outpost of Valdivia and later in Santiago as a royalist during the early phase of the Chilean struggle for independence.  He was born in Estepona, near Málaga in southern Spain. A soldier by profession, he had to migrate Chile in 1775 after having killed a man in a duel in Spain. In late 1792 he led Spanish forces that suppressed a Huilliche uprising around Río Bueno and Futahuillimapu in southern Chile. After leading a mutiny to restore colonial order in Santiago on April 1, 1811, he was summarily executed on the orders of pro-independence leader Juan Martínez de Rozas.

References

1747 births
1811 deaths
People from Estepona
Royalists in the Hispanic American Revolution
Spanish military personnel of the Chilean War of Independence
Executed Spanish people
19th-century executions